Iron Liege (March 11, 1954 – December 14, 1972) was an American Thoroughbred racehorse best known for winning the 1957 Kentucky Derby.

Background
Iron Liege was a bay horse bred and owned by Calumet Farm. He was sired by Calumet's leading sire Bull Lea, out of the mare Iron Maiden a daughter of the 1937 U.S. Triple Crown champion, War Admiral. Iron Maiden also produced Iron Reward, the dam of Swaps.

He was trained throughout his racing career by Hall of Fame trainer Jimmy Jones.

Three-year-old season

As a three-year-old colt in 1957 leading up to the Kentucky Derby, Jones frequently ran his stablemates Iron Liege and the more highly regarded Gen. Duke coupled.  These races included an Allowance win by Iron Liege over Gen. Duke at Hialeah, and a third-place finish to victorious Gen. Duke and Bold Ruler in the Florida Derby.  Both were entered in the Derby Trial preceding the Kentucky Derby, with Gen. Duke finishing second and Iron Liege fifth.  After the race Jones determined that Gen. Duke was not fit to run in the Derby, which left Iron Liege his sole entrant against perhaps the greatest field ever assembled for the race, including: Bold Ruler, Round Table, and Gallant Man.  Future Hall of Fame jockey Bill Hartack, who was Gen. Duke's regular rider, was assigned to ride Iron Liege in the Derby.

In the Derby Iron Liege took the lead over pacesetter Federal Hill, but would encounter a fast-charging Gallant Man in deep stretch.  As the two passed the  mile pole, Gallant Man's rider, future Hall of Fame jockey Bill Shoemaker, stood up in his irons long enough for Gallant Man to briefly lose his stride.  Iron Liege would go on to hold off Gallant Man and win by a nose in a driving finish, with Round Table third and Bold Ruler fourth.  After first blaming his actions on a bad step by Gallant Man, Shoemaker later admitted that he misjudged the  mile pole as the finish line, and he was suspended 15 days by the Churchill Downs stewards for "gross carelessness".  Shoemaker's gaffe has been noted in books, in articles, and on online sites, as one of the biggest blunders in racing history.

Following up his Kentucky Derby win, Iron Liege finished second to Bold Ruler in the Preakness, but did not compete in the Belmont Stakes.  Iron Liege also finished second in the American Derby to Round Table.  As a three-year-old Iron Liege also posted stakes wins in the Forerunner Stakes, Sheridan Stakes, Laurance Armour Memorial Handicap, and the Jersey Stakes. As a four-year-old, Iron Liege won the McLennan Handicap.

Stud record
Iron Liege stood as a breeding stallion in Japan and died at the Shizunai stud in Hokkaido in 1972. The best of his offspring included:
 
 Strong Eight (Arima Kinen, Naruo Kinen, American Jockey Club Cup)
 Taiho Hero (Naruo Kinen, Megro Kinen, Sapporo Kinen)
 Adjar (Prix Perth)

Pedigree

 Iron Liege was inbred 3 × 4 to the stallion Teddy and the mare Plucky Liege, meaning that these horses appear in both the third and fourth generations of his pedigree.

References

External links

Kentucky Derby winners
Racehorses bred in Kentucky
Racehorses trained in the United States
1954 racehorse births
1972 racehorse deaths
Thoroughbred family A4